Pseudopolynesia hebe is a moth in the family Geometridae. It is found in New Guinea, as well as on Sulawesi and the southern Moluccas.

References

Moths described in 1915
Eupitheciini